The Fife Amateur Football Association (FAFA) was a football (soccer) league competition for amateur clubs in the Fife peninsula of Scotland. The association is affiliated to the Scottish Amateur Football Association. The association had three divisions.

The league folded in 2017 and merged with the Kingdom Caledonian Amateur Football Association to create the Kingdom of Fife AFA.

League membership
In order to join the association, clubs need to apply and are then voted in by current member clubs.

2015-16 league members

Premier Division
Buckhaven Town
Burntisland United
Dysart FC
Fossoway FC
Kingdom Athletic FC
Kirkcaldy YMCA
Pittenweem Rovers FC
Rosyth FC
St Andrews University
Valleyfield FC

Division One
AM Soccer Club
Auchtermuchty Bellvue
Denbeath FC
Fife Thistle FC
Hearts of Beath FC
Inverkeithing Hillfield Swifts
Leslie Hearts FC
Methilhill Strollers
Rosebank AFC
St Andrews Amateurs FC

Division Two
FC Bayside
Freuchie
Glenrothes Athletic FC
Glenrothes Strollers FC
Kingseat Athletic FC
Kirkcaldy Rovers FC
Lomond United FC
Lomond Victoria FC
St Monans Swallows
United Colleges

External links
Fife AFA League Website

Football in Fife
2000 establishments in Scotland
Defunct football leagues in Scotland
2017 disestablishments in Scotland